Governor Hale may refer to:

John Hale (British Army officer) (1728–1806), Governor of Londonderry
Samuel W. Hale (1823–1891), 39th Governor of New Hampshire
William Hale (Wyoming politician) (1832–1885), Governor of Wyoming Territory